= Bharana Naka =

Village in Maharashtra

- Village
- Interactive map of Bharana Naka
- Country: India
- State: Maharashtra

Bharana Naka is a village in Ratnagiri district, Maharashtra state in Western India. The 2011 Census of India recorded a total of 2,903 residents in the village. Bharana Naka's geographical area is approximately 78 hectares (190 acres).
